Because of a Woman is a 1917 American silent drama film directed by Jack Conway and starring Jack Livingston, Belle Bennett, Louella Maxam, and George Chesebro.

Cast
 Belle Bennett as Valerie 
 Jack Livingston as Noel Clavering 
 Louella Maxam as Muriel Gwynne
 George Chesebro as Allan Barrett 
 Lillian Langdon as Luela Malvern 
 Josef Swickard as Col. Gwynne 
 George C. Pearce as John Trenton

References

Bibliography
 James Robert Parish & Michael R. Pitts. Film directors: a guide to their American films. Scarecrow Press, 1974.

External links
 

1917 films
1917 drama films
1910s English-language films
American silent feature films
Silent American drama films
Films directed by Jack Conway
American black-and-white films
Triangle Film Corporation films
1910s American films